Love and Death is an original novel based on the U.S. television series Angel. Tagline: "It's open season on monsters."

Plot summary
Huge numbers of demon-killers are descending upon L.A., provoked by outspoken radio host Mac Lindley. They plan to rid the city of demons as rapidly and violently as possible.

Angel Investigations is finding these angry mobs more of a hindrance than a help. Cordy knows bits and pieces but Angel Investigations is focusing on solving a case of a family who came to Los Angeles from Iowa; they were murdered together as Angel raced to try to save them.

Soon Lorne is attacked and Connor goes missing. Angel realizes that the demon-hunters cannot tell the difference between a good demon and a bad one. None of them are safe from the crazy pack of do-gooders.

Continuity
Characters include: Angel, Cordelia, Wesley, Gunn, Fred, Lorne and Connor.
This is the final original Angel novel to be published
Supposed to be set in Angel season 4.

Canonical issues

Angel books such as this one are not usually considered by fans as canonical. Some fans consider them stories from the imaginations of authors and artists, while other fans consider them as taking place in an alternative fictional reality. However unlike fan fiction, overviews summarising their story, written early in the writing process, were 'approved' by both Fox and Joss Whedon (or his office), and the books were therefore later published as officially Buffy/Angel merchandise.

External links

Reviews
Teen-books.com - Reviews of this book

Angel (1999 TV series) novels
2004 American novels
2004 fantasy novels
Novels by Jeff Mariotte